The 2019–20 Lehigh Mountain Hawks men's basketball team represented Lehigh University during the 2019–20 NCAA Division I men's basketball season. The Mountain Hawks, led by 13th-year head coach Brett Reed, played their home games at Stabler Arena in Bethlehem, Pennsylvania as members of the Patriot League. They finished the season 11–21, 7–11 in Patriot League play to finish in a tie for eighth place. They defeated Loyola (MD) in the first round of the Patriot League tournament before losing in the quarterfinals to Colgate.

Roster

Schedule and results

|-
!colspan=9 style=| Non-conference regular season

|-
!colspan=9 style=| Patriot League regular season

|-
!colspan=9 style=| Patriot League tournament

Source

References

Lehigh Mountain Hawks men's basketball seasons
Lehigh
Lehigh
Lehigh